The 2006 CPL World Season was a series of electronic sports competitions organized by the Cyberathlete Professional League in the fall of 2006. It was a follow up of the 2005 CPL World Tour and was announced by the CPL on July 1, 2006.

The tour featured two games, Counter-Strike and Quake 3. After a total of seven qualifier events, the finals were held on 16–20 December 2006 at the Hyatt Regency hotel in Dallas, Texas. The championship finals had a total prize purse of $150,000 and were won by fnatic (Counter-Strike) and Paul "czm" Nelson (Quake 3).

Results

Counter-Strike

Quake III

World Season events

Singapore
Location: Singapore
Date: September 15–17, 2006
Games: Counter-Strike, Quake 3
Winners:  fnatic,  Fan "Jibo" Zhibo

Brazil
Location: Sao Paulo
Date: November 15–19, 2006
Games: Counter-Strike, Quake 3
Winners:  g3nerationX,  Daniel "Ryu" Souza De Lima

Italy
Location: Verona
Date: November 24–26, 2006
Games: Counter-Strike, Quake 3
Winners:  Against All Authority,  Magnus "fojji" Olsson

Australia
Location: Perth
Date: November 25–26, 2006
Games: Quake 3
Winner:  Andrew "Python" Chacha

China
Location: Chengdu
Date: November 25–26, 2006
Games: Counter-Strike
Winners:  Star.ex

South Korea
Location: Seoul
Date: November 27, 2006
Games: Counter-Strike
Winners:  Lavega Gaming

Nordic
Location: Jonkoping, Sweden
Date: November 30 - December 3, 2006
Games: Counter-Strike, Quake 3
Winners:  Ninjas in Pyjamas,  Fan "Jibo" Zhibo

Championship finals
Location: Dallas, Texas
Date: December 16–20, 2006
Games: Counter-Strike, Quake 3
Winners:  fnatic,  Paul "czm" Nelson

References

External links
 World Season website
 World Season Finals website

C
Cyberathlete Professional League